Barbat may refer to:
Bărbat, early Romanian voivode
Barbat, Croatia, a village on the island of Rab, Croatia
Bărbat River in Romania
Barbat (lute), an ancient Persian plucked lute (Persian: بربط or Arabic: عود)
Luis Barbat, Uruguayan football goalkeeper

See also
Barbatus (disambiguation)
Barbot (disambiguation)